The Confederate Monument in Owingsville in Bath County, Kentucky, near Owingsville, Kentucky, commemorates the Confederate soldiers who hailed from Bath County.  It is located in Owingsville Cemetery.

On July 17, 1997, the Confederate Monument in Owingsville was one of sixty-one different monuments related to the Civil War in Kentucky placed on the National Register of Historic Places, as part of the Civil War Monuments of Kentucky Multiple Property Submission.

Gallery

References

Civil War Monuments of Kentucky MPS
National Register of Historic Places in Bath County, Kentucky
Confederate States of America monuments and memorials in Kentucky
1907 sculptures
1907 establishments in Kentucky